The Swedish Junior Match-play Championship is a national golf tournament in Sweden for golfers under the age of 22, contested for both men and women. The championship is open to Swedish citizens until the year they turn 21.  

In Swedish known as JSM Match, it has been organized by the Swedish Golf Federation since 1939. From 1977 to 1991 the championship was contested in stroke-play, the Swedish Junior Stroke-play Championship. Since 2001, the match-play and stroke-play championships have been held in parallel. Five players, four women and one man, have won both in the same year: Louise Stahle (2002), Caroline Hedwall (2006), Isabella Deilert (2010), Linnea Ström (2012) and David Nyfjäll (2018). Two men, Jonas Blixt and Jesper Svensson, have also won both tournaments, but not in the same season.

Winners

Source:

See also
Swedish Matchplay Championship

References

Golf tournaments in Sweden
Junior golf tournaments
Recurring sporting events established in 1939
1939 establishments in Sweden